Kynapse is the artificial intelligence middleware product, developed by Kynogon, which was bought by Autodesk in 2008 and called Autodesk Kynapse. In 2011, it has been re-engineered and rebranded Autodesk Navigation.

Since the discontinuation of Autodesk Gameware, the product is obsolete.

Features 
 A complete 3D pathfinding
 An automatic AI data generation tool
 Optimizations for multicore/multiprocessing/Cell architectures
 Spatial reasoning
 Streaming mechanisms to handle very large terrains
 The management of dynamic and destructible terrains

Usage 
Kynapse has been used in the development of more than 80 game titles including Mafia II, Crackdown, Alone in the Dark 5, Fable II, Medal of Honor: Airborne, Sacred 2: Fallen Angel, Watchmen: The End Is Nigh, Sonic the Hedgehog (2006), The Lord of the Rings Online: Shadows of Angmar and the Unreal Engine. Kynapse is also being used by companies such as EADS, BAE Systems or Électricité de France to develop military or industrial simulation.

References

External links 
 

Middleware for video games